Doriopsis is a genus of sea slugs, specifically dorid nudibranchs. These animals are marine gastropod molluscs in the family Dorididae.

Species
Species within the genus Doriopsis include:
 Doriopsis granulosa (Pease, 1860)
 Doriopsis pecten Collingwood, 1881
Species brought into synonymy
 Doriopsis jousseaumei Vayssière, 1912: synonym of Dendrodoris jousseaumei (Vayssière, 1912)

References

Dorididae
Gastropod genera